The president of the Federal Republic of Nigeria is the head of state and head of government of the Federal Republic of Nigeria. The president directs the executive branch of the federal government and is the commander-in-chief of the Nigerian Armed Forces.

The offices, powers, and titles of the head of state and the head of government were officially merged into the office of the presidency under the 1979 Constitution of Nigeria.

Executive power is vested in the president. The power includes the execution and enforcement of federal law and the responsibility to appoint federal executive, diplomatic, regulatory, and judicial officers. Based on constitutional provisions empowering the president to appoint and receive ambassadors and conclude treaties with foreign powers, and on subsequent laws enacted by the House, the presidency has primary responsibility for conducting foreign policy.

The president also plays a leading role in federal legislation and domestic policymaking. As part of the system of checks and balances, the Constitution gives the president the power to sign or veto federal legislation.

The president is directly elected in national elections to a four-year term, along with the vice president.

Muhammadu Buhari is the 15th and current president of Nigeria, having assumed office on 29 May 2015. Following the 2023 Nigerian presidential election, Bola Tinubu is scheduled to succeed Buhari as president on 29 May 2023.

History
On 1 October 1960, Nigeria gained independence from Britain. An all-Nigerian Executive Council was headed by a Prime minister, Alhaji Sir Abubakar Tafawa Balewa. On 16 November 1960, Nnamdi Azikiwe became the first governor-general of a federation of three regions of the north, east and west, with Lagos as the Federal Capital. Each of the regions was headed by a premier with a governor as ceremonial head. The governors and governor-general represented the Queen of Nigeria, Elizabeth II. On 1 October 1963, Nigeria became a Federal Republic thereby abolishing its monarchy, but remained a member of the Commonwealth of Nations. An amendment to the 1960 Independence Constitution replaced the office of the governor-general with that of the president. Nnamdi Azikwe was sworn into that office on 1 October 1963. The office at that time was primarily ceremonial, and the main duties of the president were on such things as receiving foreign dignitaries and opening Parliament. 

In a January 1966 failed coup d'état, a group of army officers, led by Major Chukwuma Nzeogwu, overthrew the central and regional governments, killed the prime minister Abubakar Tafawa Balewa, and tried to take control of the government. Nzeogwu was countered, captured, and imprisoned by General Johnson Aguiyi-Ironsi. General Aguiyi-Ironsi was named Military Head of State.

In July 1966, a group of northern army officers revolted against the government, killed General Johnson Aguiyi-Ironsi, and appointed the army chief of staff, General Yakubu Gowon as the head of the new military government.

In 1975, General Yakubu Gowon was deposed and General Murtala Mohammed was the head of the Federal Military Government of Nigeria until his assassination in 1976. On his death, the chief-of-staff, Supreme Headquarters (equivalent to a vice-president) general Olusegun Obasanjo assumed office of head of state in a meeting of the Supreme Military Council, keeping the chain of command established by Murtala Muhammed in place. Gen. Obasanjo was responsible for completing the democratic transition begun by his predecessor, which culminated in an election in August 1979.

In 1979, Nigeria adopted a federal presidential constitution. The presidency became an executive post, with powers similar to those of its American counterpart. The legislature was a bicameral National Assembly, comprising a Senate and House of Representatives. 

In October 1979, after more than 13 years of military rule, Nigeria returned to democratic rule. The National Party of Nigeria emerged victorious in the presidential election and Shehu Shagari became the first democratically elected president. 

On 31 December 1983, the military overthrew the Second Republic. Major General Muhammadu Buhari emerged as the chairman of the Supreme Military Council (SMC), the new head of state.

In August 1985, General Buhari's government was peacefully overthrown by the Army chief of staff, Major General Ibrahim Babangida. Babangida became the president and chairman of the Armed Forces Ruling Council.

In August 1993, General Babangida stepped down and chose an interim government to replace him. Ernest Shonekan was named as interim president. General Sani Abacha seized power from Shonekan in November 1993 and became the president and chairman of the Provisional Ruling Council.

On 8 June 1998, General Abacha died at the presidential villa in the Nigerian capital, Abuja.  Major General Abdulsalami Abubakar became the new president and chairman of the Provisional Ruling Council.

On 29 May 1999 Major General Abdulsalami Abubakar stepped down, and the former military head of state, Olusegun Obasanjo, became the civilian president. Obasanjo served two terms in office.

In May 2007, Umaru Yar'Adua was sworn in as President of the Federal Republic of Nigeria, the 13th head of state of Nigeria. Yar'Adua died on 5 May, 2010 in the presidential villa, in Abuja, Nigeria.

On 6 May 2010 Vice President Goodluck Jonathan was sworn in as President of the Federal Republic of Nigeria and the 14th head of state.

On 29 May 2015 Muhammadu Buhari was sworn in as President of the Federal Republic of Nigeria and the 15th head of state after winning the general election.

Electoral system
The president of Nigeria is elected using a modified two-round system with up to three rounds. To be elected in the first round, a candidate must receive a plurality of the votes, as well as over 25% of the vote in at least 24 of the 36 states and the Federal Capital Territory. If no candidate passes this threshold, a second round will be held between the top candidate and the next candidate to have received a majority of votes in the highest number of states. In the second round, a candidate still must receive the most votes, as well as over 25% of the vote in at least 24 of the 36 states and the Federal Capital Territory in order to be elected. If neither candidate passes this threshold, a third round will be held, where a simple majority of the votes is required to be elected.

Presidential candidates run for office with a running mate, their party's candidate for vice president.

Eligibility
Chapter VI, Part I, Section 131 of the constitution states that a person may be qualified for election of the office of the president if:

 They are a citizen of Nigeria by birth;
 They have attained the age of 35 years (40 before 2018);
 They are a member of a political party and are sponsored by that political party;
 They have been educated up to at least School Certificate level or its equivalent.

A person who meets the above qualifications is still disqualified from holding the office of the president if:
 They have voluntarily acquired the citizenship of a country other than Nigeria (except in such cases as may be prescribed by the National Assembly) or they have made a declaration of allegiance to such other country;
 They have been elected to such office at any two previous elections;
 Under the law in any part of Nigeria, they are adjudged to be a lunatic or otherwise declared to be of unsound mind;
 They are under a sentence of death imposed by any competent court of law or tribunal in Nigeria or a sentence of imprisonment or fine for any offence involving dishonesty or fraud or for any other offence, imposed on them by any court or tribunal or substituted by a competent authority for any other sentence imposed on them by such a court or tribunal;
 Within a period of less than ten years before the date of the election to the office of President they have been convicted and sentenced for an offence involving dishonesty or they have been found guilty of the contravention of the Code of Conduct;
 They are an undischarged bankrupt, having been adjudged or otherwise declared bankrupt under any law in force in Nigeria or any other country;
 Being a person employed in the civil or public service of the Federation or of any State, they have not resigned, withdrawn or retired from the employment at least thirty days before the date of the election; or
 They are a member of any secret society;
 They have been indicted for embezzlement or fraud by a Judicial Commission of Inquiry or an Administrative Panel of Inquiry or a Tribunal set up under the Tribunals of Inquiry Act, a Tribunals of Inquiry law or any other law by the federal or state government which indictment has been accepted by the federal or state government, respectively;
 They have presented a forged certificate to the Independent National Electoral Commission.

Oath of office
The Constitution of Nigeria specifies an oath of office for the president of the federation.  The oath is administered by the chief justice of the Supreme Court of Nigeria or the person for the time being appointed to exercise the functions of that office:

Presidents by time in office 

This is a list of each president in order of term length. This is based on the difference between dates; if counted by number of calendar days, all the figures would be one greater except for Olusegun Obasanjo and Muhammadu Buhari who would have two extra days, as they served in two non-consecutive periods.

Of the 13 presidents, only two, Olusegun Obasanjo and Muhammadu Buhari, served for multiple periods.

Residence 
The President of Nigeria lives and works in the Aso Rock Presidential Villa.

See also

List of governors and governors-general of Nigeria
List of heads of state of Nigeria
Nigerian presidential inauguration
Prime Minister of Nigeria
List of Nigerian presidents by age

References 

Nigeria
Politics of Nigeria
 
Government of Nigeria
1963 establishments in Nigeria